Belle Isle is a city in Orange County, Florida, United States. The population was 7,032 at the 2020 census. It is part of the Orlando–Kissimmee–Sanford Metropolitan Statistical Area.

History

The Belle Isle area was first inhabited by the Timucua people circa the 9th century. The first organized government of Belle Isle was established in 1924, with C. H. Hoffner as the community's first mayor. This government lasted until 1928, when it was deactivated. Belle Isle was re-established in 1954, and has been running continuously since.

Since 2003, Belle Isle has run under a council-manager government, with the mayor being a strictly ceremonial position. Seven commissioners are elected to represent their respective districts on the city council. All elected officials serve three year terms without compensation.

In 2009, the City of Belle Isle established its own police department, which would take over the area's jurisdiction from the Orange County Sheriff. The incorporation of the department has almost doubled the total number of city employees, increasing the number from 11 to 20.

Geography

The city of Belle Isle is close to Orlando International Airport, being only three miles northwest of it; Orlando itself is only five miles north. Belle Isle is the location of Lake Conway, one of Greater Orlando's largest lakes. The southern portion of Little Lake Conway, another large lake, is also in Belle Isle.

Demographics

As of the census of 2000, there were 5,531 people, 2,199 households, and 1,618 families residing in the city. The population density was 2,873.2 inhabitants per square mile (1,106.5/km2). The racial makeup of the city was 91.88% White, 4.36% African American, 0.13% Native American, 1.25% Asian, 0.02% Pacific Islander, 1.32% from other races, and 1.05% from two or more races. Hispanic or Latino of any race were 5.98% of the population.

There were 2,199 households, out of which 29.2% had children under the age of 18 living with them, 62.9% were married couples living together, 7.3% had a female householder with no husband present, and 26.4% were non-families. 20.2% of all households were made up of individuals, and 8.0% had someone living alone who was 65 years of age or older. The average household size was 2.52 and the average family size was 2.89.

In the city, the population was spread out, with 22.7% under the age of 18, 4.7% from 18 to 24, 28.9% from 25 to 44, 27.0% from 45 to 64, and 16.7% who were 65 years of age or older. The median age was 42 years. For every 100 females, there were 100.4 males. For every 100 females age 18 and over, there were 99.3 males.

The median income for a household in the city was $65,155, and the median income for a family was $68,571. Males had a median income of $47,394 versus $32,150 for females. The per capita income for the city was $29,087. About 1.9% of families and 2.9% of the population were below the poverty line, including 1.2% of those under age 18 and 4.2% of those age 65 or over.

References

External links
 
 City of Belle Isle official website

Cities in Orange County, Florida
Greater Orlando
Populated places established in 1924
Cities in Florida
1924 establishments in Florida